Ronald Reagan received numerous awards and honors after his presidency.

Awards
 Sylvanus Thayer Award by the United States Military Academy (1989)
 Naval Heritage award by the U.S. Navy Memorial Foundation (1998)
 Congressional Gold Medal by the United States Congress (May 16, 2002)

Honors
 Laureate of The Lincoln Academy of Illinois (1981)
 Order of Lincoln by the governor of Illinois
 Distinguished Service Medal by the American Legion (1982)
 Golden Pheasant Award by the Scout Association of Japan (1983)
 Honorary knight Grand Cross of the Order of the Bath (1989)
 Grand Cordon of the Order of the Chrysanthemum by Japan (1989)
 Grand Cross of the Order of Merit of the Federal Republic of Germany (September 3, 1990)
 Honorary citizenship of Berlin (November 1992)
 Presidential Medal of Freedom by U.S. President George H. W. Bush (January 18, 1993)
 Republican Senatorial Medal of Freedom by Republican U.S. senators
 Grand Cross of the Order of the White Lion by the Czech Republic (1999)
 Order of the White Eagle by Polish President Lech Kaczyński (2007) (in-memoriam)

Halls of Fame
 National Speakers Association Speaker Hall of Fame
 California Hall of Fame (2006)

References

Ronald Reagan
Reagan, Ronald